"The Dreams That Rot in Your Heart" is a song by 16volt, released as a single on July 23, 1996 by Re-Constriction Records. It was the only single created to support the band's third album LetDownCrush, which was released in August of that year.

Reception
Black Monday was negatively critical of "The Dreams That Rot in Your Heart" and "Two Wires Thin", saying "the former has these horrid metal parts, and the later is just so ‘big’ and anthemic."

Track listing

Personnel
Adapted from the liner notes of The Dreams That Rot in Your Heart/Two Wires Thin.

16volt
 Marc LaCorte – guitar, programming
 Eric Powell – lead vocals, programming, guitar, production, engineering, editing

Addition performers
 Bryan Barton – loops (1)

Production and design
 Dave Friedlander – engineering
 Jon Irish – engineering
 Jeff "Critter" Newell – engineering

Release history

References

External links 
 The Dreams That Rot in Your Heart/Two Wires Thin at Discogs (list of releases)

1996 songs
16volt songs
Re-Constriction Records singles